The Old Dundee ACL Railroad Depot is a historic Atlantic Coast Line Railroad depot in Dundee, Florida. It is located at 103 Main Street. On July 30, 2001, it was added to the U.S. National Register of Historic Places.

The Dundee Depot Museum is located in the historic depot. In 2009, the museum was renamed the Margaret Kampsen Historic Dundee Depot Museum.  The museum houses items of local and railroad history.

Gallery

References
General
 Polk County listings at National Register of Historic Places
 Dundee Depot Museum at Florida's Office of Cultural and Historical Programs
Specific

External links

Dundee Depot Museum – official site

Railway stations on the National Register of Historic Places in Florida
Atlantic Coast Line Railroad stations
Dundee
Museums in Polk County, Florida
History museums in Florida
National Register of Historic Places in Polk County, Florida
Railroad museums in Florida
Railway stations in the United States opened in 1912
1912 establishments in Florida
Transportation buildings and structures in Polk County, Florida